Verchères is a provincial riding in the Montérégie region of Quebec, Canada.  It corresponds exactly to the territory of Marguerite-D'Youville Regional County Municipality.

It was created for the 1867 election (and an electoral district of that name existed earlier in the Legislative Assembly of the Province of Canada and the Legislative Assembly of Lower Canada).  It disappeared in the 1939 election and its successor electoral district was Richelieu-Verchères; however, it was re-created for the 1944 election.

In the change from the 2001 to the 2011 electoral map, it lost Saint-Roch-de-Richelieu to the riding of Richelieu, La Présentation to the riding of Saint-Hyacinthe, and several municipalities to the riding of Borduas, but gained Sainte-Julie from the defunct riding of  Marguerite-D'Youville. Sainte-Julie is now the biggest municipality in the district

Members of the Legislative Assembly / National Assembly

Election results

|}2014 results reference:

|}* Coalition Avenir Québec change is from the Action démocratique.
2012 results reference:

|-Chou. 
 
|Liberal
|Vincent Sabourin
|align="right"|6,464
|align="right"|22.87
|align="right"|+8.68

|-

|-
 
|Liberal
|Paul Verret
|align="right"|4,751
|align="right"|14.19
|align="right"|-3.45
|-

|}
* Increase is from UFP

|-
 
|Liberal
|Jean Robert
|align="right"|3,344
|align="right"|17.64
|align="right"|-10.52

|-

|}

|-
 
|Liberal
|Mario Lebrun
|align="right"|8,720
|align="right"|28.16
|align="right"|+4.97

|-

|-

|}

References

External links
Information
 Elections Quebec

Election results
 Election results (National Assembly)

Maps
 2011 map (PDF)
 2001 map (Flash)
2001–2011 changes (Flash)
1992–2001 changes (Flash)
 Electoral map of Montérégie region
 Quebec electoral map, 2011

Quebec provincial electoral districts
Sainte-Julie, Quebec
Varennes, Quebec